Malombra is a 1942 Italian drama film directed by Mario Soldati and starring Isa Miranda, Andrea Checchi and Irasema Dilián. It is based on the novel Malombra by Antonio Fogazzaro, which had previously been adapted into a 1917 silent film of the same title. It was made at Cinecittà with sets designed by Gino Brosio. It was produced by Riccardo Gualino's Lux Film. It belongs to the movies of the calligrafismo style.

The film is a gothic melodrama, set in the castle on the edge of Lake Como during the Nineteenth century.

Cast
 Isa Miranda as Marina di Malombra 
 Andrea Checchi as Corrado Silla 
 Irasema Dilián as Edith Steinegge
 Gualtiero Tumiati as Il conte Cesare d'Ormengo  
 Nino Crisman as Nepo Salvador  
 Enzo Biliotti as Il commendator Napoleone Vezza 
 Ada Dondini as Fosca Salvador  
 Giacinto Molteni as Andrea Steinegge  
 Corrado Racca as Padre Tosi  
 Luigi Pavese as Il professore Binda  
 Nando Tamberlani as Don Innocenzo  
 Doretta Sestan as Fanny  
 Paolo Bonecchi as Il dottor Pitour  
 Elvira Bonecchi as Giovanna, la governante  
 Giovanni Barrella as L'ispettore della cartiera  
 Giacomo Moschini as Giorgio Mirovitch, il notaio  
 Anna Huala as La governante di Fosca

Locations
The movie was shot in the Villa Pliniana, Torno (Como). (Info by the Dizionario del Turismo Cinematografico)

References

Bibliography 
 Gundle, Stephen. Mussolini's Dream Factory: Film Stardom in Fascist Italy. Berghahn Books, 2013.

External links 

 

1942 films
Italian historical drama films
Italian black-and-white films
1940s historical drama films
1940s Italian-language films
Films directed by Mario Soldati
Films based on Italian novels
Films set in the 19th century
Films shot at Cinecittà Studios
Lux Film films
1942 drama films
1940s Italian films